Gonobidya Niketon (High School), also known as Gonobidya Niketon (its name up to 2005), is a private secondary educational institution in Bangladesh established in 1974. Although the school was set up to cater for the need of the children of surrounding areas, students come from all parts of Narayanganj. The main campus of Gonobidya Niketan is in the heart of Narayanganj Sadar Upazila.

History
The school was founded on March 15, 1974. The students participated in S.S.C. (Secondary School Certificate) examination (O-level equivalent) for the first time in 1975.

During the first 23 years, the school kept its growth as a boy's high school for day shift only. Following demands and requests, a morning shift for girls was added in 1997.

To make room for more students the administration established a new building on the occasion of the 20th anniversary in 1995.

In 2012, a regular committee was formed by the direct vote of guardians and teachers.

Academics
The school offers secondary education for boys and girls even though it is not coeducational. Generally, boys and girls are split into separate shifts. Girls attend school in the morning shift while boys attend starting from noon.

Teachers
Institution section: 75 teachers
 Morning shift: 35 teachers
 Day shift: 40 teachers

Administration 
Like all other high schools, the chief of the school section administration is the headmaster while there is an assistant headmaster in each of the shifts in the branches. They are selected by the jury board of veteran teachers.

The headmaster is Ahmed Hossain.

The Governing Body members are elected for five years.

Extracurricular activities 
 Scouting: the institute's scout group is the team of Bangladesh Scout, Narayanganj. It consists of one club team, one scout team, one girl cub, and one girl scout team. They have participated in many national and international Scout events.
 Games and Sports
 Debating
 English Society

References

External links 
 

Schools in Bangladesh
Educational institutions established in 1974
1974 establishments in Bangladesh
Education in Narayanganj